Curt Maggitt (born February 4, 1993) is a former American football linebacker. He played college football at Tennessee and signed with the Indianapolis Colts as an undrafted free agent in 2016.

Early years
Maggitt attended and played high school football at William T. Dwyer High School. He played for the Panthers under head coach Jack Daniels. For his senior season, he was named the Sun Sentinel's Palm Beach County Defensive Player of the Year.

College career
Maggitt attended and played college football at the University of Tennessee from 2011–2015 under head coaches Derek Dooley and Butch Jones. In the 2011 season, he started eight games at strong-side linebacker as a true freshman. As a sophomore in 2012, he started nine games. In the season opener against NC State, he was credited with an 18-yard sack and forced a fumble that resulted in a safety. In the 4OT loss to Missouri, he suffered a torn ACL and was out for the remainder of the season. He took a redshirt year for the 2013 season to recover. He returned from his injuries and started in ten games in the 2014 season. On the year, he recorded 11 sacks on the season, 48 total tackles, and one forced fumble. In the 2015 season, he started the first two games but suffered a hip injury which sidelined him for the rest of the season. Maggitt declined to seek a sixth year of collegiate eligibility and declared for the NFL Draft.

Collegiate statistics

Professional career

Indianapolis Colts
Maggit was signed by the Colts as an undrafted free agent on May 2, 2016. He made the Colts' 53-man roster as a rookie playing in nine games registering seven tackles before being placed on injured reserve on December 12, 2016. On May 12, 2017, the Colts waived Maggitt after reaching an injury settlement.

Saskatchewan Roughriders
On May 20, 2018, Maggitt was signed by the Saskatchewan Roughriders. He played in nine games. He was released by the team prior to the 2019 season.

Personal life
Curt is the son of Roosevelt Maggitt, Sr. and Marilyn Bivins. Curt's brother, Roosevelt Jr., played defensive end at Iowa State.

References

External links

Collegiate statistics from Sports-Reference.com
Tennessee Volunteers bio

1993 births
Living people
Sportspeople from West Palm Beach, Florida
Players of American football from Florida
American football linebackers
Tennessee Volunteers football players
Indianapolis Colts players
Saskatchewan Roughriders players
American players of Canadian football